The 420G is a 6-speed manual transmission manufactured by Getrag.

BMW used this transmission with M60 V8 models such as the European manual 840i, European manual 740i, 540i; as well as the M62 powered 5 series sedans, and S62 powered vehicles such as the Z8 and M5. This gearbox was also used in the E34 M5, E36 M3, and E46 M3s with the S38B38, S50B32, and S54B32 engines respectively.

For the aforementioned applications there are three incompatible bellhousing boltpatterns: one for 8-cylinder engines (540i, 740i, 840i, E39 M5, Z8), one for the larger S38 6-cylinder engine (E34 M5, only for 1995), and one for the smaller 6-cylinder engines (M3). Bellhousings can be swapped among V8 and L6 engines, however this is not advised, as bearing preload is determined in part by precise case dimensions. Furthermore, the V8 and smaller L6 transmissions also have different output flanges (which can be swapped) and input shafts (which cannot, practically speaking).

Among owners and mechanics, the transmission has a reputation for being strong, quiet, and routinely able to handle considerably more torque than its official rating. However, internal shift linkages are its one known failure point, and neither BMW nor Getrag will provide replacement internal parts (except some shift linkage parts), rebuild instructions, or rebuild service. The only solution to a failed gearbox is a replacement transmission.

Gear ratios:

Applications:
 1996-1999 BMW E36 M3 (Euro)
 2001-2006 BMW E46 M3
 1993-1996 BMW E34 540i and M5
 1996-2004 BMW E39 540i and M5
 1994–1998 BMW E38 7 Series
 1993–1999 BMW E31 8 series
 2000–2003 BMW E52 Z8

References 

420G